Copley Press was a privately held newspaper business, founded in Illinois, but later based in La Jolla, California. Its flagship paper was The San Diego Union-Tribune.

History 
Founder Ira Clifton Copley launched Copley Press c. 1905, eventually amassing over two dozen papers. After selling the Western Utility Corporation, Copley purchased twenty-four newspapers in Southern California for $7.5 million. He managed these publishing holdings as Copley Press, Inc. and was its first president, serving until 1942.

Copley Press purchased Springfield's Illinois State Journal in 1927. In 1942, Copley bought the Journals Democratic-oriented competitor, the Illinois State Register, promising that the Register could keep its independent editorial voice. The two papers were merged in 1974 into The State Journal-Register.

In 1928, Copley bought the San Diego Union and San Diego Tribune, which eventually became the company's flagship publications. Later that year, Senator George W. Norris accused Copley Press of receiving money from public utility companies, but Copley successfully defended his position before the Federal Trade Commission in 1929.  The two papers operated separate editions until 1992, when they were merged as The San Diego Union-Tribune.Copley News Service''' — a wire service that distributed news, political cartoons, and opinion columns —  was founded in 1955.

Dissolution
Copley Press began selling off properties in the 2000s. Hollinger International bought the Company's Chicago-area publications (The Herald News, The Beacon News, The Courier News, and The News Sun, along with several smaller papers) in 2000. The remaining Illinois papers (The State Journal-Register, the Peoria Journal Star, The Repository, and some smaller papers) were sold to GateHouse Media in 2007.

In 2006, the Daily Breeze was sold to Hearst. In December 2007, the Union-Tribune reported that Copley Press was selling La Casa del Zorro, a resort it owned in Borrego Springs. Copley News Service itself was sold to Creators Syndicate for an undisclosed price and renamed Creators News Service, on 1 July 2008.

In late July 2008, the company began seeking buyers for the Union-Tribune, as well as several other businesses like Enlace, a free Spanish-language tabloid, and SignOnSanDiego.com, the online arm of the U-T. The announcement did not make clear what, if anything, would be left with the Copley Press name. Platinum Equity agreed in March 2009 to purchase the Union-Tribune for an unspecified sum. Copley Press currently is working with Evercore Partners, the same company that helped sell off other business units, to determine a price for the remaining assets.

Declining advertising revenue was cited as the reason for the company's dissolution.

Pulitzer Prizes
Copley News Service and The San Diego Union-Tribune, with notable work by Marcus Stern and Jerry Kammer, won the 2006 National Reporting prize for their disclosure that former Congressman Randy Cunningham received bribes, which ultimately led to his criminal conviction and imprisonment.2006 Pulitzer Prize National Reporting

Additionally, the San Diego Evening Tribune, predecessor of the Union-Tribune, won Pulitzer Prizes in 1987 and 1979.

Allegations of collaboration with CIA and FBI
In the late 1970s, the American media reported that the Copley Press was used as a front by the Central Intelligence Agency. Reporters Joe Trento and Dave Roman claimed that James S. Copley, who served as publisher until 1973, had cooperated with the CIA since its founding in 1947. They also reported that a subsidiary division, Copley News Service, was used in Latin America by the CIA as a front.

Trento and Roman also said that reporters at the Copley-owned San Diego Union and Evening News spied on antiwar protesters for the FBI. They alleged that, at the height of these operations, at least two dozen Copley employees were simultaneously working for the CIA. James S. Copley was also accused of involvement in the CIA-funded Inter-American Press Association.Trento, Joseph, Prelude to Terror—The Rogue CIA and the Legacy of America's Private Intelligence Network, Carroll & Graf, 2005

 Publishers 
 Ira Clifton Copley — founder, president until 1942
 A. W. Shipton — 1942–1947
 James S. Copley — 1947–1973
 Helen K. Copley — 1973–2001
 David C. Copley — 2001 to 2009

Former properties
 Alhambra Post-Advocate Aurora Beacon News (Illinois)
 Burbank Daily Review Copley News Service
 Daily Breeze (Torrance, California)
 Daily Journal (Wheaton, Illinois) (Wheaton, Illinois)
 Elgin Courier-News (Illinois)
 Glendale News-Press Joliet Herald-News (Illinois)
 KCOP-TV (Los Angeles)
 Lake County News-Sun (Gurnee, Illinois)
 Naperville Sun (Naperville, Illinois)
 Peoria Journal Star San Pedro News-Pilot (Port of Los Angeles area)
 The Repository (Stark County, Ohio)
 The Sacramento Union The San Diego Union-Tribune The Santa Monica Evening Outlook The State Journal-Register (Springfield, Illinois)
 Venice Evening Vanguard''

References

Copley Press publications
Newspaper companies of the United States
Pulitzer Prize for National Reporting winners